Zhaojiatiao Station, is a transfer station on the Wuhan Metro. It entered revenue service on December 28, 2015. It is located in Jiang'an District. The station is an interchange station of Line 3 and Line 8.

Station layout

Gallery

References

Wuhan Metro stations
Line 3, Wuhan Metro
Line 8, Wuhan Metro
Railway stations in China opened in 2015